Jason Roberts is an American author acclaimed for his work in fiction and narrative nonfiction. He is a former journalist and technologist.

The son of Pulitzer Prize-winning photojournalist Anthony Kalani Roberts and the actress Gloria Neil, Roberts grew up in Southern California and Hawaii. A graduate of the University of California at Santa Cruz, he worked as a software engineer at Apple Computer before leaving to write a series of books on both hardware and software topics, then to serve as a technology reporter for the Village Voice.  An early proponent of the Internet, in 1996 Roberts launched the Learn2 Corporation, one of the first sources for non-academic instruction on the Internet. In 1999, the company began publicly trading on the NASDAQ exchange; it has since been acquired by Oracle Corporation. In 2000, shortly after Yahoo! ranked Learn2 as “One of the Ten Most Important Websites of the 20th Century”, Roberts retired from management and returned to writing.

In 2004, Roberts was the inaugural winner of the Van Zorn Prize, awarded by Michael Chabon for the best short fiction exemplifying the tradition of Edgar Allan Poe. In 2006 Roberts’ A Sense of the World, the first biography of the blind traveller James Holman (1786-1857), was a national bestseller, a finalist for the National Book Critics Circle Award and longlisted for the Guardian First Book Award. The book was also named a "Best Book of the Year" by the Washington Post, San Francisco Chronicle, Kirkus Reviews, St. Louis Post-Dispatch, and the Rocky Mountain News. In 2018, Roberts announced his next book, Every Living Thing, had been acquired by Random House.

Roberts’ first five books were on technical topics, such as object-oriented programming. He is the editor of The Learn2 Guide, as well as four titles in the bestselling 642 Books series, each collections of creative materials for writers.

Roberts lives in Oakland, California. He is a board member of the Community of Writers, and a frequent member of the teaching faculty there.

References

External links
Official website
Bio from US publisher HarperCollins
An updated bibliography of works by Roberts
"The Latest in Innuendo Bumper Stickers" by Jason Roberts at McSweeney's Internet Tendency

Living people
21st-century American novelists
American male novelists
Place of birth missing (living people)
Year of birth missing (living people)
Writers from San Francisco
University of California, Santa Cruz alumni
American male journalists
Journalists from California
American male short story writers
21st-century American biographers
21st-century American short story writers
21st-century American male writers
American male biographers